Ion Mihai Pacepa (28 October 1928 – 14 February 2021) was a Romanian two-star general in the Securitate, the secret police of the Socialist Republic of Romania, who defected to the United States in July 1978 following President Jimmy Carter's approval of his request for political asylum. He was the highest-ranking defector from the former Eastern Bloc, and wrote books and articles on the inner workings of communist intelligence services. His best known works are the books Disinformation and Red Horizons.

At the time of his defection, Pacepa simultaneously had the rank of advisor to President Nicolae Ceaușescu, acting chief of his foreign intelligence service, and a parliamentary undersecretary at Romania's Ministry of Interior.

Subsequently, he worked with the American Central Intelligence Agency (CIA) in operations against the former Eastern Bloc. The CIA described his cooperation as "an important and unique contribution to the United States".

Activity in Romanian intelligence
Ion Mihai Pacepa's father (born in 1893) was raised in Gyulafehérvár (today Alba Iulia, Romania), in the Transylvania region of Austria-Hungary, where he worked in his father's small kitchenware factory. On 1 December 1918, Transylvania united with Romania, and in 1920, Pacepa's father moved to Bucharest and worked for the local branch of the American car company General Motors.

Born in Bucharest in 1928, Ion Mihai Pacepa studied industrial chemistry at the Politehnica University of Bucharest between 1947 and 1951, but just months before graduation, he was drafted by the Securitate and gained his engineering degree only four years later. He was assigned to the Directorate of Counter-sabotage of the Securitate. In 1955, he was transferred to the Directorate of Foreign Intelligence.

In 1957, Pacepa was appointed head of the Romanian intelligence station in Frankfurt, West Germany, where he served for two years. In October 1959, Minister of the Interior Alexandru Drăghici appointed him as head of Romania's new industrial espionage department, the S&T (short for Știință și Tehnologie, meaning "science and technology" in Romanian) of Directorate I. He was the head of Romanian industrial espionage, which he managed until he defected in 1978. Pacepa claimed he was involved with the establishment of Romania's automobile industry, and with the development of its microelectronic, polymer, and antibiotic industries.

From 1972 to 1978, Pacepa was also President Nicolae Ceaușescu's adviser for industrial and technological development and the deputy chief of the Romanian foreign intelligence service.

Defection
Pacepa defected in July 1978 by walking into the US Embassy in Bonn, West Germany, where he had been sent by Ceaușescu with a message to Chancellor Helmut Schmidt. He was flown secretly to Andrews Air Force Base near Washington, D.C., in a United States military aircraft.

In a letter to his daughter, Dana, published in the French newspaper Le Monde in 1980 and broadcast over and over by Radio Free Europe, Pacepa explained the reason for defecting: "In 1978 I got the order to organize the killing of Noël Bernard, the director of Radio Free Europe's Romanian program who had infuriated Ceaușescu with his commentaries. It was late July when I got this order, and when I ultimately had to decide between being a good father and being a political criminal. Knowing you, Dana, I was firmly convinced that you would prefer no father to one who was an assassin."

Noël Bernard died in 1981 of cancer; his wife, suggested he had been irradiated by the Securitate. She also linked Bernard's death to those of RFE journalists such as Cornel Chiriac (stabbed to death), as well as Emil Georgescu and Vlad Georgescu, both of whom also died of cancer. According to Bernard's wife, Noël's Securitate file had attached an article from a magazine which talks about Noël undergoing surgery, with a note which argues that the article confirms "the measures undertaken by us are starting to have an effect". Pacepa later claimed a supposed radiological weapon named Radu was used against dissenters and critics by the Securitate. According to Pacepa, "Radu" was a Romanian name used as a reference to "radiation", with the intention to lead the target to cancer which would result in death within months after the exposure.

Pacepa's defection destroyed the intelligence network of communist Romania, and through the revelations of Ceaușescu's activity, it affected his international credibility and respectability. An article published by The American Spectator in 1988 summed up the devastation caused by Pacepa's "spectacular" defection: "His passage from East to West was a historic event, for so carefully had he prepared, and so thorough was his knowledge of the structure, the methods, the objectives, and the operations of Ceaușescu's secret service, that within three years the entire organization had been eliminated. Not a single top official was left, not a single major operation was still running. Ceaușescu had a nervous breakdown, and gave orders for Pacepa's assassination. At least two squads of murderers have come to the United States to try to find him, and just recently one of Pacepa's former agents — a man who had performed minor miracles in stealing Western technology in Europe at Romanian behest — spent several months on the East Coast, trying to track him down. They didn't succeed."

During September 1978, Pacepa received two death sentences from Communist Romania, and Ceaușescu decreed a bounty of US$2 million for his death. Yasser Arafat and Muammar Gaddafi set a further $1 million each. In the 1980s, Romania's political police enlisted Carlos the Jackal to assassinate Pacepa in the United States in exchange for $1 million. Documents found in the Romanian intelligence archives show that the Securitate had given Carlos a whole arsenal to use in "Operation 363" to assassinate Pacepa in the United States. Included were 37 kg plastic explosive EPP/88, seven submachine guns, one Walther PP pistol serial # 249460 with 1306 bullets, eight Stechkin pistols with 1049 bullets, and five hand grenades UZRG-M.

Carlos was unable to find Pacepa, but on 21 February 1981, he bombed a part of Radio Free Europe's headquarters in Munich, which was broadcasting news of Pacepa's defection. Five Romanian diplomats in West Germany, who had helped Carlos the Jackal in this operation, were expelled from the country.

On 7 July 1999, Romania's Supreme Court Decision No. 41/1999 cancelled Pacepa's death sentences and ordered for his properties, confiscated by Ceaușescu's orders, to be returned to him. Romania's government refused to comply. In December 2004, the new government of Romania restored Pacepa's rank of general.

According to Michael Ledeen in 2016, the two death sentences remained in effect, and Pacepa "has lived in secret" since his defection.

Writings and political views
Pacepa was a columnist for the Internet conservative blog site PJ Media. He also wrote articles for The Wall Street Journal and American conservative publications, such as National Review Online, The Washington Times, the online newspaper FrontPage Magazine, and World Net Daily.

Red Horizons
In 1987, Pacepa wrote a book published in the United States by Regnery Gateway, Red Horizons: Chronicles of a Communist Spy Chief. A Romanian translation of Red Horizons printed in the U.S. was infiltrated into Communist Romania, and a Mao-style pocketbook of Red Horizons was illegally printed in Communist Hungary (now a valuable collector’s item). In 1988, Red Horizons was serialized on Radio Free Europe, arousing "huge interest among Romanians". According to Radio Romania, "the streets of Romania's towns were empty" during the RFE serialization of Red Horizons. On 25 December 1989, during the last part of the Romanian Revolution, Ceaușescu and his wife, Elena, were sentenced to death. Pacepa claimed that at the trial most of the accusations came almost word-for-word out of Red Horizons (a second edition, published in March 1990, contained the transcript of Ceauşescu's trial, which was based on facts presented in Red Horizons). President Ronald Reagan reportedly called “Red Horizons” his “Bible” for dealing with dictators.

On 1 January 1990, the book began being serialized in the new official Romanian newspaper Adevărul (The Truth), which on that day replaced the Communist Scînteia (The Spark). In its lead, Adevărul explained that the book's serialization by Radio Free Europe had "played an incontestable role" in overthrowing Ceaușescu, according to the text on the back cover of the book's second edition, published during 1990. Red Horizons was subsequently republished in 29 countries, and it was made into a documentary movie by the Hungarian TV.

During 1993, Pacepa published The Kremlin's Legacy. During 1999, he authored the trilogy The Black Book of the Securitate, which has become a bestseller in Romania.

Looming Disaster
The book Looming Disaster was written by Pacepa together with Ronald Rychlak. Far-right propaganda website WND introduced it in August 2016, as follows: "This November's election spells 'LOOMING DISASTER,' warns former communist spymaster and disinformation expert, Gen. Ion Mihai Pacepa."

Alleged assassinations by the KGB
In a 2006 article, Pacepa describes a conversation he had with Ceaușescu, who told him about "ten international leaders the Kremlin killed or tried to kill": László Rajk and Imre Nagy from Hungary; Lucrețiu Pătrășcanu and Gheorghe Gheorghiu-Dej from Romania; Rudolf Slánský and Jan Masaryk from Czechoslovakia; Mohammad Reza Pahlavi, the Shah of Iran; Palmiro Togliatti from Italy; US President John F. Kennedy; and CCP Chairman Mao Zedong. Pacepa provides some additional details, such as an alleged plot to kill Mao Zedong with the help of Lin Biao organized by the KGB.

Programmed to Kill

In 2007, Ivan R. Dee published Pacepa's book Programmed to Kill: Lee Harvey Oswald, the Soviet KGB, and the Kennedy Assassination that argues Lee Harvey Oswald was recruited as a KGB agent. According to Pacepa, Soviet Premier Nikita Khrushchev ordered the assassination of John F. Kennedy, then changed his mind but was unable to stop Oswald. Pacepa wrote that Jack Ruby was subsequently instructed to kill Oswald in order to silence him. The work was said to rely heavily on the work of the Warren Commission, the House Select Committee on Assassinations, and Edward Jay Epstein.

In a review of Pacepa's book published in Human Events, Michael Ledeen, former adviser for terrorism to President Ronald Reagan, writes: "A new book from General Ion Mihai Pacepa is cause for celebration, because he is among a tiny handful of people who know a lot about the intelligence services of the Soviet Empire, and because he writes about it with rare lucidity, always with an eye to helping us understand our world. His first book, 'Red Horizons,' is indubitably the most brilliant portrait of a Communist regime I've ever read. 'Programmed to Kill' is equally fascinating. Pacepa painstakingly takes us through the documentary evidence, including invaluable material on Soviet bloc cyphers that throws new light on Oswald's letters to KGB officers in Washington and Mexico City. … No novelist could have written a more exciting story, made all the more compelling because of Pacepa's first-hand involvement in the Russians' efforts to hide their Oswald connection."  In H-Net Reviews, Stan Weeber called Programmed to Kill "a superb new paradigmatic work on the death of President Kennedy" and "a 'must read' for everyone interested in the assassination of President Kennedy."

Publishers Weekly stated "those inclined to suspect a conspiracy was behind JFK's murder will likely remain unpersuaded by Pacepa's circumstantial, speculative case" and that Programmed to Kill offered "no convincing Soviet motive for the assassination." According to author Joseph Goulden in The Washington Times, Pacepa's belated account "rests rather flimsily on circumstantial evidence and supposition." In a review for Studies in Intelligence, Hayden B. Peake called Pacepa's theory an "imaginative story" and "implausible".

Alleged Soviet role in supporting terrorism in the Middle East
In a 2006 article written during the Second Lebanon War, Pacepa wrote that the Soviet Union spread anti-Semitic propaganda across the Middle East to increase hatred for Jews, and by extension Israel and America. Pacepa writes that Soviet propagandists described America as a "Jewish fiefdom" and spread the idea that Israel planned to make the Islamic Middle East into a "Jewish colony." Furthermore, he describes the Soviet Union's alleged role in propagating and funding terrorist groups in the Middle East.

Alleged Soviet campaign against the Vatican

Pacepa alleged that the Soviet Union tried to discredit the Papacy. In a 2007 article, he stated: "In my other life, when I was at the center of Moscow's foreign-intelligence wars, I myself was caught up in a deliberate Kremlin effort to smear the Vatican, by portraying Pope Pius XII as a coldhearted Nazi sympathizer."

In 2012, Pacepa revealed he was writing a book called Disinformation that gives details of the Seat 12 plot and the Soviet "science" of framing. It is co-authored by Pius XII expert and professor of law at the University of Mississippi, Ronald J. Rychlak. In an interview, Pacepa claimed that the original idea to blacken the Pontiff's reputation came from Joseph Stalin in 1945, who wanted the Church out of Ukraine. On 3 June 1945, his Radio Moscow proclaimed that Pius XII had been "Hitler's Pope." But the insinuation fell flat as it came the day after Pius XII had condemned the "Satanic spectre of Nazism" on Vatican Radio. Moreover, Pius was being lauded for his wartime efforts to protect religious minorities by, among others, President Roosevelt, Winston Churchill (who described him as "the greatest man of our time"), and Albert Einstein. Stalin's disinformation efforts were rejected by that contemporary generation "that had lived through the real history and knew who Pope Pius XII really was," Pacepa explained. He said the KGB tried again, promoting Rolf Hochhuth's 1963 play The Deputy. As that generation "had not lived through that history and did not know better, [this] time it worked."

Disinformation
In 2013, Pacepa published Disinformation: Former Spy Chief Reveals Secret Strategies for Undermining Freedom, Attacking Religion, and Promoting Terrorism co-authored with law professor Ronald J. Rychlak, who studies the history of religion, and which would become his most recognizable work.

Iraq and WMD

Pacepa supported the 2003 invasion of Iraq. In opposition, large anti-war demonstrations were held in cities across the world. Pacepa contends that these protests were contrived and anti-American, which Russia assisted. Pacepa wrote during October 2003 that it was "perfectly obvious to me" that the Russian GRU agency helped Saddam Hussein to destroy, hide, or transfer his chemical weapons prior to the American invasion of Iraq during 2003. He claimed that an operation for the removal of chemical weapons ("Operation Sarindar") had been prepared by the Soviet Union for Libya and that such a plan was being implemented in Iraq.

Death
He died from COVID-19 on 14 February 2021, at age 92, during the COVID-19 pandemic in the United States. Pacepa's life was discussed on BBC Radio 4's obituary programme Last Word .

Published books
 Red Horizons: Chronicles of a Communist Spy Chief, 1987. 
 Red Horizons: the 2nd Book. The True Story of Nicolae and Elena Ceaușescu's Crimes, Lifestyle, and Corruption, 1990. 
 The Kremlin Legacy, 1993
 Cartea neagră a Securității, Editura Omega, Bucharest, 1999. 
 Programmed to Kill: Lee Harvey Oswald, the Soviet KGB, and the Kennedy Assassination, 2007. 
 Disinformation: Former Spy Chief Reveals Secret Strategies for Undermining Freedom, Attacking Religion, and Promoting Terrorism'', 2013.

See also
Active measures
List of conspiracy theories
List of Eastern Bloc defectors
Radu (weapon)

References

External links

Ion Mihai Pacepa at National Review Online
Ion Mihai Pacepa at OpinionJournal
E-book: Red Horizons on Google Books

1928 births
2021 deaths
Romanian people of Slovak descent
Military personnel from Bucharest
Politehnica University of Bucharest alumni
Securitate generals
Romanian anti-communists
Romanian defectors
Cold War spies
People convicted of treason against Romania
People sentenced to death in absentia
Researchers of the assassination of John F. Kennedy
Romanian emigrants to the United States
Defectors to the United States
American columnists
Deaths from the COVID-19 pandemic in New Jersey